This is a list of all spacecraft landings on other planets and bodies in the Solar System, including soft landings and both intended and unintended hard impacts. The list includes orbiters that were intentionally crashed, but not orbiters which later crashed in an unplanned manner due to orbital decay.

Landings
Colour key:
{|
|-
| – Unsuccessful soft landing, intentional hard landing, or mission still in progress.
|-
| – Successful soft landing with intelligible data return.  The tannish hue indicates extraterrestrial soil.
|-
| – Successful soft landing, intelligible data return, and sample return to Earth.  The greenish hue indicates terrestrial return.
|-
| – Successful soft landing, data/voice/video communication, sample return to Earth, and safe astronaut landing and return to Earth.
|}

Planets

Mercury

Venus

Mars

Jupiter

Jupiter is a gas giant with a very large atmospheric pressure and internal temperature and thus there is no known hard surface on which to "land". All missions listed here are impacts on Jupiter.

Saturn

Saturn is a gas giant with a very large atmospheric pressure and internal temperature and thus there is no known hard surface on which to "land". All missions listed here are impacts on Saturn.

Planetary moons

Earth's Moon

Moons of Mars

Phobos

Moons of Saturn

Titan

Other bodies

Asteroids

Comets

See also
Deliberate crash landings on extraterrestrial bodies
List of artificial objects on extraterrestrial surfaces
List of extraterrestrial orbiters
List of rovers on extraterrestrial bodies
Timeline of space exploration

References

Spaceflight timelines

Venus-related lists

Extraterrestrial